The Xinmin–Tongliao high-speed railway is a high-speed railway in China. Opened on 29 December 2018, it is the first high-speed railway to cross into Inner Mongolia.

Route
At its southern terminus are connections to the Beijing–Shenyang high-speed railway in both east and west directions.

Stations

References

High-speed railway lines in China
Railway lines opened in 2018